Nuxia glomerulata is a species of plant in the Stilbaceae family. It is endemic to South Africa, where it has a restricted range between Pretoria and Zeerust. It resembles Nuxia congesta but the leaves are more elliptic, leathery and glabrous. It is threatened by habitat loss.

References

Endemic flora of South Africa
Stilbaceae
Near threatened plants
Flora of the Northern Provinces
Taxonomy articles created by Polbot